Gurali, also known as Gorali, is a small village located in the Gujrat District of Punjab, Pakistan. The village has a high school which is run by the Government of Punjab, Pakistan under the Board of Intermediate and Secondary Education, Gujranwala. It also has healthcare facilities, including the Rural Dispensary and the Social Security Hospital. The Pakistan Electric Fan Manufacturers Association supports economic growth in the village. Gurali's population consists almost entirely of Muslims. Most of the people earn their living from farming or as laborers. A few people in the area work for the government. Gurali can be reached by road or railway train.

See also 

 Gujrat, Pakistan
 Gujranwala District

References 

Populated places in Gujrat District
Villages in Gujrat District